The 2012 Visa U.S. National Gymnastics Championships was the 49th edition of the U.S. National Gymnastics Championships. The competition was held from June 7–10, 2012 at the Chaifetz Arena in St. Louis, Missouri.

Event information 
The forty-ninth edition of the Championships, the competition was held at the Chaifetz Arena in St. Louis, Missouri, a multi-purpose arena located on the Saint Louis University campus.  The competition was televised by NBC Sports Network.

Competition schedule 
The competition featured Senior and Junior competitions for both women's and men's disciplines. The competition was as follows;

Thursday, June 7
1 p.m. - Junior Men Competition - Day 1
6:30 p.m. - Senior Men's Competition - Day 1

Friday, June 8
1 p.m. - Junior Women's Competition - Day 1
6:30 p.m. - Senior Women's Competition - Day 1

Saturday, June 9
11:30 a.m. - Senior Men's Competition - Final Day
6 p.m. - Junior Men's Competition - Final Day

Sunday, June 10
10 a.m. - Junior Women's Competition - Final Day
2:30 p.m. - Senior Women's Competition - Final Day

Note: all times are in Central Time Zone.

Sponsorship 
Visa was the title sponsor of the event as they had been since 2004.

Medalists

National Team
The following seniors were named to the National Team – Jordyn Wieber, Gabby Douglas, Aly Raisman, Kyla Ross, Elizabeth Price, Sarah Finnegan, Sabrina Vega, Kennedy Baker, Brenna Dowell, Bridget Sloan, McKayla Maroney, Alicia Sacramone, Rebecca Bross, Anna Li, and Nastia Liukin.  The following juniors were named to the National Team – Lexie Priessman, Madison Desch, Simone Biles, Bailie Key, Katelyn Ohashi, Amelia Hundley.

Participants 
The following individuals are participating in competition:

Senior

 Kennedy Baker –  Flower Mound, TX
 Mackenzie Brannan –  Austin, TX
 Rebecca Bross –  Plano, TX
 Brianna Brown –  West Chester, OH
 Gabby Douglas –  Virginia Beach, VA
 Brenna Dowell –  Odessa, MO
 Sarah Finnegan –  St. Louis, MO
 Brandie Jay –  Fort Collins, CO
 Amanda Jetter –  Milford, OH
 Anna Li –  Aurora, IL
 Nastia Liukin –  Parker, TX
 McKayla Maroney –  Long Beach, CA
 Grace McLaughlin –  Allen, TX
 Abigail Milliet –  Denton, TX
 Elizabeth Price –  Coopersburg, PA
 Alexandra Raisman –  Needham, MA
 Kyla Ross –  Aliso Viejo, CA
 Alicia Sacramone –  Winchester, MA
 MyKayla Skinner –  Gilbert, AZ
 Bridget Sloan –  Pittsboro, IN
 Sabrina Vega –  Carmel, NY
 Jordyn Wieber –  DeWitt, MI
 McKenzie Wofford –  McKinney, TX

Junior

 Alexis Beucler – Findlay, OH
 Simone Biles – Spring, TX
 Lacy Dagen – Pleasanton, CA
 Nia Dennis – New Albany, OH
 Madison Desch – Lenexa, KS
 Peyton Ernst – Coppell, TX
 Ashley Foss – Towaco, NJ
 Ariana Guerra – League City, TX
 Lauren Hernandez – Old Bridge, NJ
 Amanda Huang – Roswell, GA
 Veronica Hults – Allen, TX
 Amelia Hundley – Hamilton, OH
 Bailie Key – Coppell, TX
 Ashton Kim – Westlake, TX
 Nicole Lehrmann – Cedar Park, TX
 Shannon McNatt – Houston, TX
 Maggie Nichols – Little Canada, MN
 Katelyn Ohashi – Plano, TX
 Lexie Priessman – Cincinnati, OH
 Polina Shchennikova – Arvada, CO
 Megan Skaggs – Marietta, GA
 Meredith Sylvia – Macungie, PA
 Jessica Wang – Chino Hills, CA

References 

U.S. National Gymnastics Championships
Gymnastics competitions in the United States
2012 in gymnastics
2012 in American sports